Klæmint Matras (born 20 May 1981 in Tórshavn, Faroe Islands) is a retired football midfielder that spent his entire career with B36 Tórshavn in the Faroe Islands Premier League. He has also been capped with the Faroe Islands national football team.

Club career
Klæmint Matras is the player of B36 Tórshavn who has most appearances in UEFA matches. According to UEFA.com he has 19 appearances. Throughout his career with B36, Matras appeared in 277 Faroe Islands Premier League matches scoring 21 goals. He also captained the team.

References

External links
 
 UEFA.com

1981 births
Living people
People from Tórshavn
Faroese footballers
Faroe Islands international footballers
Association football midfielders
B36 Tórshavn players